Kunzea capitata  is a shrub species in the family Myrtaceae. It is native to New South Wales in Australia.

Description
Flowers are pink to purple, or occasionally white. These are produced on the branch ends in "heads".

Taxonomy
The species was first formally described by English botanist James Smith in 1797 in Transactions of the Linnean Society of London, and given the name Metrosideos capitata.
The species epithet capitata is derived from the Latin word caput (head), alluding to the arrangement of the flowers.

It was transferred to the genus Kunzea in 1846 by German botanist Gustav Heynhold.

Distribution and habitat
The species occurs in heathland and dry sclerophyll forest from the Ulladulla district northward to Richmond River.

Cultivation
The species prefers a moist soil in a lightly shaded to sunny position. It is readily propagated by either seed or cuttings.

References

capitata
Flora of New South Wales
Plants described in 1846
Myrtales of Australia
Endemic flora of Australia